Erick Osornio Núñez (born 3 May 1983 in Puebla, Puebla) is a Mexican former taekwondo practitioner. At the 2012 Summer Olympics, he competed in the men's 68 kg competition, but was defeated in the first round.

He announced his retirement from the sport in 2013.

References

External links
 

Mexican male taekwondo practitioners
1983 births
Living people
Olympic taekwondo practitioners of Mexico
Taekwondo practitioners at the 2012 Summer Olympics
Sportspeople from Puebla
People from Puebla (city)
Pan American Games medalists in taekwondo
Pan American Games bronze medalists for Mexico
Universiade medalists in taekwondo
Taekwondo practitioners at the 2003 Pan American Games
Taekwondo practitioners at the 2007 Pan American Games
Universiade silver medalists for Mexico
Medalists at the 2005 Summer Universiade
Medalists at the 2003 Pan American Games